Marina is a genus of legumes. They are known as the false prairie clovers. Unlike the related prairie clovers (genus Dalea), which bear two ovules per fruit (with typically only one fully maturing to become a viable seed), false prairie clovers bear only one ovule per fruit.

Species
Marina comprises the following species:

 Marina alamosana (Rydb.) Barneby
 Marina brevis León-de la Luz
 Marina calycosa (A. Gray) Barneby
 Marina capensis Barneby
 Marina catalinae Barneby
 Marina chrysorrhiza (A. Gray) Barneby
 Marina crenulata (Hook. & Arn.) Barneby
 Marina diffusa (Moric.) Barneby
 Marina dispansa (Rydb.) Barneby
 Marina divaricata (Benth.) Barneby
 Marina evanescens (Brandegee) Barneby
 Marina gemmea Barneby
 Marina ghiesbreghtii Barneby
 Marina goldmanii (Rose) Barneby
 Marina gracilis Liebm.
 Marina gracillima (S. Watson) Barneby
 Marina grammadenia Barneby
 Marina greenmaniana (Rose) Barneby
 Marina holwayi (Rose) Barneby
 Marina interstes Barneby
 Marina maritima (Brandegee) Barneby
 Marina melilotina Barneby
 Marina minor (Rose) Barneby
 Marina minutiflora (Rose) Barneby
 Marina neglecta (Robinson) Barneby
 var. elongata (Rose) Barneby
 var. neglecta (Robinson) Barneby
 Marina nutans (Cav.) Barneby
 Marina oculata (Rydb.) Barneby
 Marina orcuttii (S. Watson) Barneby
 Marina palmeri (Rose) Barneby
 Marina parryi (A. Gray) Barneby
 Marina peninsularis (Rose) Barneby
 Marina procumbens (DC.) Barneby
 Marina pueblensis (Brandegee) Barneby
 Marina sarodes Barneby
 Marina scopa Barneby
 Marina spiciformis (Rose) Barneby
 Marina stilligera Barneby
 Marina unifoliata (Robinson & Greenm.) Barneby
 Marina vetula (Brandegee) Barneby
 Marina victoriae León-de la Luz

References

External links

USDA Plants Profile

Amorpheae
Fabaceae genera